Nansen Sound is an uninhabited strait in Qikiqtaaluk, Nunavut, Canada. It lies between western Grant Land on Ellesmere Island and Axel Heiberg Island.  Tanquary Fiord or Greely Fiord enters the sound from the east.

Notes

References
Merriam-Webster's Geographical Dictionary, Third Edition. Springfield, Massachusetts: Merriam-Webster, Incorporated, 1997. .

Sound
Sounds of Qikiqtaaluk Region